Rivula aenictopis is a moth of the family Erebidae first described by Turner in 1908. It is found in northern Queensland, Australia.

References

"Species Rivula aenictopis Turner, 1908". Australian Faunal Directory. Archived October 9, 2012.

Moths of Australia
Hypeninae
Moths described in 1908